Acacia subtiliformis is a shrub of the genus Acacia and the subgenus Phyllodineae. It is native to an area in the  Pilbara region of Western Australia.

It blooms in June and produces yellow flowers.

See also
List of Acacia species

References

subtiliformis
Acacias of Western Australia
Taxa named by Bruce Maslin